Wood is the second studio album by Canadian artists Moxy Früvous, released in 1995. The album was intended to reflect more mature, serious songwriting, in contrast to their prior albums, which had focused more on wit and humor.

Critical reception
Trouser Press called the band "a latter-day acoustic America," writing that "the sweet singing and a hint of wit faintly echo Bargainville."

Track listing
"Down from Above"  – 4:34
"Horseshoes"  – 3:57
"Fly"  – 4:57
"The Present Tense Tureen"  – 3:38
"Poor Mary Lane"  – 3:28
"On Her Doorstep"  – 3:22
"Misplaced"  – 4:35
"It's Too Cold"  – 3:26
"Bed and Breakfast"  – 4:11
"Nuits de Rêve"  – 6:05
"Sad Today"  – 4:26
"Organ Grinder" (hidden track,  – 2:39)

The hidden track "Organ Grinder" is recorded on the CD as an extension to track 11 "Sad Today," with a silent gap of 2 minutes separating the songs.

References

See also
1995 in music

1995 albums
Moxy Früvous albums